Inspiration Point Shelter House is an open-air pavilion located at Marion Samson Park in Fort Worth, Texas.  Built in 1927, the pavilion stands on a limestone bluff facing south-southwest overlooking Lake Worth dam, an old fish hatchery and the Naval Air Station Joint Reserve Base.  The structure was designed in a style sometimes referred to as National Park Service Rustic or Parkitecture.  It was built primarily of limestone.  On December 22, 1973, a fire destroyed the original roof.  The pavilion was restored in 2011.  It was added to the National Register of Historic Places on March 31, 2014.

See also

National Register of Historic Places listings in Tarrant County, Texas

References

External links

Buildings and structures in Fort Worth, Texas
National Register of Historic Places in Fort Worth, Texas
Park buildings and structures on the National Register of Historic Places in Texas
Buildings and structures completed in 1927